Coffee Time is a chain of Canadian snack and coffee shops, headquartered in Scarborough, Ontario. Coffee Time operates over 100 stores across Canada in Ontario and Alberta. Coffee Time serves coffee along with other specialty drinks, baked goods, breakfast sandwiches, and deli sandwiches and soup.

History
Coffee Time was founded in 1982 by Tom Michalopoulos in Bolton, Ontario. The first stores were operated under license agreements before they moved onto franchising in the late 1980s. In October 2006, Chairman's Brand Corporation (Coffee Time's parent company) purchased the Afton Food Group, which owned Robin's Donuts, 241 Pizza, and Mrs. Powell's Cinnamon Buns. In 2014, Coffee Time began updating and rebranding its locations.

Coffee Time Arena
An indoor soccer arena was built in 1998 in Vaughan, Ontario, and it was named "Coffee Time Arena."  Located about 300 m east of Martin Grove Road (location number 7500/7700), it is near an industrialized area and north of Vaughan Grove Sports Park. The complex also includes an outdoor soccer field. The name was used for only three years before the arena was sold and renamed "The Soccer Centre" in the early-2000s.

See also
 List of coffeehouse chains
 List of doughnut shops 
List of Canadian restaurant chains

References

External links

Coffee Time
Foodservice and Hospitality Top 100 Report
Cloney Time, a lighthearted montage on the phenomenon of independent shops imitating the name and style of Coffee Time
Chairman's Brand Grows on Spending Spree
Robin's Donuts

Restaurants established in 1982
Doughnut shops
Fast-food chains of Canada
Coffeehouses and cafés in Canada
1982 establishments in Ontario
Companies based in Scarborough, Toronto